Merveille Bope Bokadi (born 21 May 1996) is a Congolese professional footballer who plays as a defender for Standard de Liège and the DR Congo national team.

Club career
In September 2019 he ruptured his anterior cruciate ligament.

International career

International goals
Scores and results list DR Congo's goal tally first.

References

External links 
 

1996 births
Living people
Footballers from Kinshasa
Democratic Republic of the Congo footballers
Democratic Republic of the Congo expatriate footballers
Democratic Republic of the Congo international footballers
2017 Africa Cup of Nations players
2019 Africa Cup of Nations players
Belgian Pro League players
TP Mazembe players
Standard Liège players
Expatriate footballers in Belgium
Association football defenders
2016 African Nations Championship players
Democratic Republic of the Congo A' international footballers
Democratic Republic of the Congo expatriate sportspeople in Belgium